The Newnes Junction railway station is a closed railway station on the Blue Mountains Line, New South Wales, Australia. It served the former private branch line to Newnes. The station closed to passenger services in 1975, although it still physically exists and is occasionally used for coal trains visiting the nearby Clarence Colliery. The station consists of an island 'Up' platform, and a single side 'Down' platform.

History 
The first station was finished around 1906 at the time of the Newnes railway line. After the Zig Zag deviation was completed the station was no longer needed for passenger services but stayed in use to finalise the recovery of parts from the Zig Zag and Clarence area along the Dargans Deviation.

The second station (also called "Newnes Junction') replaced the earlier station which operated from 1906 to 1910. The Wolgan Valley Railway closed in 1932 and for years the station had no use at all until the construction of the loop line that served the Clarence Colliery in the 1970s.

In 1957 electrification crossed the Blue Mountains and the sidings and colliery loop were electrified. In 2006 the overhead catenary was decommissioned and was removed from the colliery balloon loop.

The station was burnt to the ground resulting from the 2019 Gospers Mountain fire.

References

Bibliography 
 
NSWrail.net

External links
Photos: Newnes Junction Station
Photos: Newnes Junction Track Circuit & Signal Diagram
Photos: Newnes Junction Future ZZR Extension Platform
 A map of the Zig Zag and all deviations including the Wolgan Valley Railway

Disused regional railway stations in New South Wales
Railway stations in Australia opened in 1905
Railway stations closed in 1975
Main Western railway line, New South Wales